Dasymalla teckiana is a flowering plant in the mint family Lamiaceae and is endemic to Western Australia. It is a small, openly branched, sticky shrub with mauve and white, bugle-shaped flowers.

Description
They are sticky, glabrous and green with a few blunt teeth along their edges near the ends.

There are five lobes on the end of the petal tube, the lower one elliptic to almost round and slightly larger than the other four lobes.

Taxonomy and naming
This species was first formally described in 1889 by Ferdinand von Mueller who gave it the name Chloanthes teckiana and published the description in the Victorian Naturalist. The type specimen was collected by John Forrest. In 1904, Georg August Pritzel changed the name to Pityrodia teckiana and in 2011, Barry Conn, Murray Henwood and Nicola Streiber changed it to Dasymalla teckiana. The specific epithet (teckiana) honours Francis, Duke of Teck.

Distribution
Dasymalla teckiana occurs in the south-west of Western Australia, mostly north of the Great Eastern Highway, as far east as Kalgoorlie in the Avon Wheatbelt, Coolgardie, Dampierland and Swan Coastal Plain biogeographic regions growing in a range of soils near granite outcrops.

Conservation
Dasymalla teckiana is classified as "not threatened" by the Government of Western Australia Department of Parks and Wildlife

References

teckiana
Plants described in 1889
Flora of Western Australia
Taxa named by Ferdinand von Mueller